This is the list of Pan American medalists in water skiing.

Men's

Jump

Slalom

Tricks

Overall

Wakeboard

Women's

Jump

Slalom

Tricks

Overall

Wakeboard

Team

All-time medal table

References

Water skiing
Medalists